Super Major League is a baseball sports video game developed and published by Sega for arcades in 1995. It is a successor to Sega's 1985 arcade baseball game Major League.

Gameplay
Super Major League is a baseball game for the Sega Titan ST-V system.

Reception
In Japan, Game Machine listed Super Major League on their September 1, 1995 issue as being the eighth most-successful arcade game of the month. Next Generation reviewed the arcade version of the game, rating it two stars out of five, and stated that "It's just so far and few between that you'll walk away before sliding another coin into this title."

References

1995 video games
Arcade video games
Arcade-only video games
Baseball video games
Sega arcade games
Video games developed in Japan